Vibrissomyia is a genus of parasitic flies in the family Tachinidae. There are about seven described species in Vibrissomyia.

Species
These seven species belong to the genus Vibrissomyia:
 Vibrissomyia bicolor Townsend, 1912
 Vibrissomyia concinnata Gonzalez, 1992
 Vibrissomyia erythrostoma (Bigot, 1888)
 Vibrissomyia lineolata (Bigot, 1888)
 Vibrissomyia notata Cortes, 1967
 Vibrissomyia oroyensis Townsend, 1914
 Vibrissomyia pullata Cortes, 1951

References

Further reading

 
 
 
 

Tachinidae
Articles created by Qbugbot